The 1971–72 Utah Stars season was the 2nd season of the Stars in Utah and 5th overall in the American Basketball Association. The Stars went 31–11 in the first half of the season, while going 29–13 in the second half of the season, with a ten-game winning streak near the end of the season. Their biggest losing streak was three, which happened four times during the season. They finished 3rd in points scored at 117.8 per game, and 4th in points allowed at 112.0 per game. The Stars swept the Dallas Chaparrals in the Semifinals but lost to the Indiana Pacers in seven games, denying them a repeat ABA Finals appearance.

Roster   
 44 John Beasley - Power forward
 31 Zelmo Beaty - Center
 24 Ron Boone - Shooting guard
 12 Mike Butler - Shooting guard
 40 Glen Combs - Shooting guard
 23 Bobby Fields - Guard
 22 Rick Fisher - Forward
 33 Ira Harge - Center
 10 Mervin Jackson - Point guard
 15 Jimmy Jones - Point guard
 35 Manny Leaks - Center
 14 Roderick McDonald - Small forward
 21 Red Robbins - Power forward
 33 George Stone - Small forward
 42 Willie Wise - Small forward

Final standings

Western Division

Playoffs
Western Division Semifinals vs. Dallas Chaparrals

Stars win series 4–0

Western Division Finals vs. Indiana Pacers

Stars lose series, 4–3

Awards and honors 
1972 ABA All-Star Game selections (game played on January 29, 1972)
Willie Wise
Zelmo Beaty
Glen Combs
All-ABA Second Team selections: Willie Wise and Zelmo Beaty.

References

External links
 RememberTheABA.com 1971–72 regular season and playoff results
 Utah Stars page

Utah Stars seasons
Utah Stars
Utah Stars, 1971-72
Utah Stars, 1971-72